Judge Priest is a 1934 American comedy film starring Will Rogers. The film was directed by John Ford, produced by Sol M. Wurtzel in association with Fox Film, and based on humorist Irvin S. Cobb's character Judge Priest. The picture is set in post-reconstruction Kentucky and the supporting cast features Henry B. Walthall, Hattie McDaniel and Stepin Fetchit. It was remade by Ford in 1953 as The Sun Shines Bright.

Plot
Personable Judge Priest (Will Rogers), known to his contemporaries as "Billy", presides over court in Fairfield, Kentucky in 1890, Jeff Poindexter is accused of chicken theft. Senator Horace Maydew, a rival in an election bid to the judge's seat, as well as the prosecuting attorney in Jeff's case, who after some distraction by Priest and the court onlookers, is found innocent. Priest befriends Jeff and goes fishing with him after court and hires him in his household. Priest's nephew, Jerome "Rome" Priest has just returned home after studying law and passing the bar, and attempts to rekindle his romance with Ellie May Gillespie, but she explains that she now has other interests. Rome's mother, Mrs. Caroline Priest, has made it her business to enforce propriety and makes it known that she is completely against a match between her son, Rome, and Ellie May, as the young woman's father has been absent and is unknown. Mrs. Priest is vocal about her hopes that Maydew's daughter, Virginia, would be a proper societal match for Rome, and pushes him in that direction. While visiting his late wife's grave, Priest takes note of local townsman, Bob Gillis, who places flowers on Ellie May's late mother's grave which later becomes relevant. Uncouth barber, Flem Talley, has been courting Ellie May, but his unwelcome advances towards Ellie May makes it appear that he's not looking for her hand in marriage. 

Flem's barber shop is a busy place, both Priest and Gillis wait their turn as Flem jokes about his courtship with Ellie Mae not heading towards marriage because she "ain't got no Pa". Gillis is immediately offended and punches Flem in the face, knocking him down. Priest expresses his relative approval, which later becomes an argument of bias by Senator Maydew that forces Priest to recuse himself when Gillis is tried for assault. He is accused of assaulting Flem at the pool hall, when in fact Gillis was defending himself from an attack by Flem and two others. Rome is very enthusiastic about representing Gillis in court, as he will be Rome's first client as attorney. The Senator pushes hard for a guilty verdict, but Reverend Ashby Brand has information that will demonstrate Gillis' long standing good moral character which Priest helps to reveal as associate counsel for the defense. The identity of Ellie May's father is also revealed, which leads to Mrs. Priest's approval as a match for her son, Rome.

Cast

 Will Rogers as Judge William 'Billy' Priest
 Tom Brown as Jerome Priest
 Anita Louise as Ellie May Gillespie
 Henry B. Walthall as Reverend Ashby Brand
 David Landau as Bob Gillis
 Rochelle Hudson as Virginia Maydew
 Roger Imhof as Billy Gaynor
 Frank Melton as Flem Talley
 Charley Grapewin as Sergeant Jimmy Bagby
 Berton Churchill as Senator Horace Maydew
 Brenda Fowler as Mrs. Caroline Priest
 Francis Ford as Juror No. 12
 Hattie McDaniel as  Aunt Dilsey
 Stepin Fetchit as Jeff Poindexter
 Winter Hall as Judge Floyd Fairleigh (uncredited) 
 Harry Tenbrook as Townsman in Saloon (uncredited)

Production notes

Will Rogers
The film played a major role in earning Will Rogers recognition as the number one box office star of 1934.  Rogers received critical praise for his performance, some noting that Rogers fell right into the role with his heart-warming personality.  Rogers managed a balance of comedic one-liners and serious dramatics. The Tulsa Daily World summed up Rogers' performance: "The star's portrayal of Judge Priest has the mark of authenticity upon it … the unique blending of unique talent with a rich and splendid role." Rogers was killed in a plane crash just a year after the release of Judge Priest.

Stepin Fetchit
In the role as Jeff Poindexter, director John Ford gave Stepin Fetchit some room to expand his comic performance. When Judge Priest asks Jeff why he is not wearing his shoes, Fetchit comically ad libs, "I’m saving them for when my feet wear out." Fetchit was known for attending lavish parties and causing mischief while off the studio lot. Right before the shooting of Judge Priest, Fetchit caused a commotion at a benefit show at the Apollo Theater in New York City. When he arrived back in Hollywood for the filming of Judge Priest, Fetchit's behavior was much better. In fact, only once was Fetchit late for a shoot (he had forgotten his make-up kit).

Hattie McDaniel
Hattie McDaniel (last name appears as "McDaniels" in the opening credits) was just beginning her trek to stardom when she shot Judge Priest.  Before this film she was a relatively unknown actress.  Stepin Fetchit apparently doubted her acting abilities at the beginning of the production, but soon realized he was working with a very talented performer.  Director John Ford noted McDaniel's acting talents.  Ford cut some of Fetchit's scenes and gave McDaniel additional scenes.  This created an initial rift between these two pioneering black actors.

Reception
The film was a success at the box office. It was one of Fox's biggest hits of the year (five of the studio's seven big hits starred Rogers).

In 1998, Jonathan Rosenbaum of the Chicago Reader included the film in his unranked list of the best American films not included on the AFI Top 100.

Music
 "My Old Kentucky Home, Good Night" (Music and lyrics by Stephen Foster) – Sung by Hattie McDaniel, Melba Brown, Thelma Brown, Vera Brown, Will Rogers and others 
 "Aunt Dilsey's Improvisation" (Written by Hattie McDaniel) – Sung by Hattie McDaniel 
 "Love's Old Sweet Song (Just a Song at Twilight)" (Music by J.L. Molloy, lyrics by J. Clifton Bingham)
 "Massa Jesus Wrote Me a Note" (Music by Cyril J. Mockridge, lyrics by Dudley Nichols and Lamar Trotti) – Sung by Hattie McDaniel and others at the festival
 "Old Folks at Home (Swanee River)" (Written by Stephen Foster)
 "Old Black Joe" (Written by Stephen Foster)
 "(I Wish I Was in) Dixie's Land" (Written by Daniel Decatur Emmett)
 "Little Brown Jug" (Music and lyrics by Joseph Winner) – Sung by Hattie McDaniel
 "Aunt Dilsey's Song" (Music by Cyril J. Mockridge, lyrics by Dudley Nichols and Lamar Trotti) – Sung by Hattie McDaniel

See also
 The Sun Shines Bright, John Ford's 1953 film based on the same original material by Irvin S. Cobb
 List of films in the public domain in the United States

References

External links 
 
 
 
 

1934 films
1934 comedy films
Fox Film films
American black-and-white films
American comedy films
American historical comedy films
Films based on short fiction
Films directed by John Ford
Films produced by Sol M. Wurtzel
Films set in Kentucky
Films set in the 1890s
Films with screenplays by Dudley Nichols
Films with screenplays by Lamar Trotti
Films scored by Samuel Kaylin
1930s English-language films
1930s American films